Pål Rustadstuen (born 1 October 1982) is a Norwegian football midfielder who has been inactive since 2017.

Early life
Rustadstuen was born in Lillehammer, Norway on 1 October 1982. He attended Norges Toppidrettsgymnas (NTG), a secondary school focused on sports.

Career
Rustadstuen played 12 matches with Lyn, his first professional club, during the 2003—2004 season and competed with them for the UEFA Cup Winners' Cup. He was loaned to Oslo Øst in early 2004 and ultimately left Lyn due to an injury. He was captain of Oslo Øst/M/S during the 2004-2005 season. He spent much of the season injured. In 2005, he signed a two-year contract with Sarpsborg and debuted in 2006. He left the team in 2009 after playing for three season. During the 2013—2014 season, he played for Greåker. He played one season for Tune Menn 1 in 2017—2018.

References

1982 births
Living people
Norwegian footballers
Lyn Fotball players
Sarpsborg 08 FF players
Association football midfielders
People from Lillehammer
Sportspeople from Lillehammer
Manglerud Star Toppfotball players
Sarpsborg FK players